Albert-Léon-Marie Le Nordez (1844–1922) was a French bishop of Dijon, from 1898, who was at the centre of a controversy leading to the 1905 separation in France of the Catholic Church and the state.

Biography
Le Nordez was born in Montebourg. A critical report on him, accusing him of being a Freemason, was sent by a parish priest to Benedetto Lorenzelli, papal nuncio in France, and forwarded to Mariano Rampolla, Cardinal Secretary of State, in 1902.

Under Rampolla's successor, Rafael Merry del Val, Le Nordez was in 1904 summoned to Rome, to consult with the new Pope Pius X. Le Nordez went to Rome in July in a blaze of publicity, and was kept "in retreat". He resigned his see in September.

This was coupled with a related disciplinary story, that of Pierre-Joseph Geay, bishop of Laval. It caused a diplomatic crisis, against a background of suspicions that these bishops had been targets because of their sympathies for French Republican politics. France broke off relations with the Holy See, a situation that lasted another 17 years. The French politician Émile Combes announced on 30 July that “la volonté du Saint-Siège rend sans emploi les relations diplomatiques entre le Vatican et la France” (the wishes of the Holy See make useless the diplomatic ties between the Vatican and France).

Notes
 

1844 births
1922 deaths
Bishops of Dijon